Bob Lagassé is a Canadian provincial politician, who was elected as the Member of the Legislative Assembly of Manitoba for the riding of Dawson Trail in the 2016 election. He is a member of the Progressive Conservative party.

Lagassé pulled off a surprise upset victory, by defeating two high-profile candidates to earn the nomination in the constituency. Lagassé is known for his sleeve length tattoo and earrings, which is considered unique for the fact the riding of Dawson Trail is known for a strong conservative demographic. Lagassé is of French and Metis origin.

He was re-elected in the 2019 provincial election.

References 

Living people
21st-century Canadian politicians
Canadian social workers
Franco-Manitoban people
Progressive Conservative Party of Manitoba MLAs
Métis politicians
Year of birth missing (living people)